Altdorf was a municipality in the canton of Schaffhausen in northern Switzerland. On 1 January 2009 Altdorf merged with Bibern, Hofen, Opfertshofen and Thayngen to form the municipality of Thayngen.

References

Twin towns - twin cities
  Óbuda-Békásmegyer – Hungary ''since 2015

External links

 

Former municipalities of the canton of Schaffhausen
Former municipalities of Switzerland